"Shined on Me" is a 2002 house song performed by Praise Cats featuring Andrea Love on vocals. Behind the band is Eric Miller, also known as E-Smoove, who composed and produced the track.

It reached #1 on the UK dance chart.

Track listings
 CD single - Europe
 "Shined on Me" (radio edit) — 3:44
 "Shined on Me" (original E-Smoove vocal mix) — 7:00

 CD single - France
 "Shined on Me" (UK radio edit) — 3:44
 "Shined on Me" (radio edit) — 3:09
 "Shined on Me" (original E-Smoove vocal mix) — 7:00
 "Shined on Me" (Bini + Martini revocal mix) — 7:01

Charts

Weekly charts

Year-end charts

References

2002 singles
2005 singles
Praise Cats songs
2002 songs
Songs written by Eric Miller (musician)